Match Group is an American internet and technology company headquartered in Dallas, Texas. It owns and operates the largest global portfolio of popular online dating services including Tinder, Match.com, Meetic, OkCupid, Hinge, PlentyOfFish and OurTime, among a total over 45 global dating companies. The company was owned by IAC until July 2020 when Match Group was spun off as a separate, public company. , the company had 9.3 million subscribers, of which 4.6 million were in North America. Japan is the company's second largest market, after the United States.

History

2009–2018 
In February 2009, IAC incorporated Match Group as a conglomerate of Match.com and other dating sites it owned. In July 2009, Match Group's Match.com acquired People Media from American Capital for $80 million in cash. People Media operated dating sites BlackPeopleMeet.com and OurTime, which became part of Match Group's portfolio, and powered AOL Personals.

In February 2010, Match.com acquired dating site Singlesnet. In February 2011, Match Group acquired OkCupid for $50 million. OkCupid was the first free, advertising-based product added to the Match Group portfolio.

In 2012, online dating application Tinder was founded within Hatch Labs, a startup incubator run by parent company IAC. The application allowed users to anonymously swipe to like or dislike other profiles based on their photos, common interests and a small bio. On November 19, 2015, the company became a public company via an initial public offering.

In 2017, Match Group launched Tinder Gold, which established Tinder as the highest grossing non-gaming app globally. In the summer of 2017, the company offered to acquire Bumble for $450 million.

In January 2018, Mandy Ginsberg, formerly the CEO of Match North America, replaced Greg Blatt as CEO of the company.

In June 2018, Match Group acquired 51% ownership in dating app Hinge. The acquisition was intended to help diversify Match's portfolio and appeal to a wider array of singles. In February 2019, Match Group fully bought out the company.

In July 2018, Match Group launched a Safety Advisory Council comprising a group of experts focused on preventing sexual assault across its portfolio of products. The council included #MeToo movement founder Tarana Burke and worked with organizations like the Rape, Abuse & Incest National Network (RAINN) and the National Sexual Violence Resource Center.

In August 2018, Tinder co-founder Sean Rad filed a $2 billion lawsuit against Match Group, claiming that Match Group and its parent company IAC purposely undervalued Tinder to avoid paying out stock options to the company's original team. Rad and his co-plaintiffs also accused the former Tinder CEO, Greg Blatt, of sexual harassment. The company said that the allegations are "meritless". In October 2019, Blatt filed a defamation lawsuit against Rad and Tinder founding member Rosette Pambakian seeking at least $50 million in damages.

2019–present 
In January 2019, Match Group partnered with media brand Betches to launch a dating app, called Ship, that allowed users to help their friends pick out potential dates.

In August 2019, the company acquired Harmonica, an Egyptian online dating service.

In January 2020, Match Group announced an investment and partnership with safety platform Noonlight. The partnership incorporated new safety tools in Match Group's products, including emergency assistance, location tracking and photo verification.

In January 2020, Mandy Ginsberg stepped down as chief executive officer due to personal reasons. Shar Dubey, then President of Match Group, became the CEO of the company effective March 1, 2020.

In March 2020, Match Group became the first tech company to support Earn It Act of 2020, a bipartisan bill with the support of President Trump to combat online child sexual exploitation but widely criticized for its predicted negative impact on privacy and computer security.

In July 2020, the company completed the separation from IAC. The separation was the largest ever for IAC, as Match Group then had a market capitalization of $30 billion. After the separation, four new members joins Match Group's board of directors: Stephen Baily, Melissa Brenner, Ryan Reynolds and Wendi Murdoch.

In August 2020, amidst the COVID-19 pandemic, Match Group reported growing profit and revenue and surpassed 10 million subscribers across its portfolio.

In September 2020, Match Group joined others companies like Spotify and Epic Games to form the Coalition for App Fairness. The purpose is to combat Apple over its app store policies.

In February 2021, Match Group announced that it would be acquiring Korea-based social network company Hyperconnect for $1.73 billion in both cash and stock. This deal is reportedly Match Group's largest acquisition to date.

Also in February 2021, Match Group took legal action against dating app Muzmatch, the online Muslim dating app, calling the app a "Tinder Clone". The Match Group won the legal battle in London courts in April 2022.

In April 2022, Shar Dubey stepped down from her position as CEO while remaining on the board of directors. Bernard Kim, the former president of Zynga, became CEO effective from May 31st, 2022.

In July 2022, Match Group acquired The League, a members-only dating app, for an undisclosed sum.

2019 legal action 
In 2019, the company was sued by the U.S. Federal Trade Commission (FTC) for allegations of unfair and deceptive trade practices. According to the FTC's civil complaint, the company used fake love interest ads to encourage free users to pay for premium subscription services on Match.com. Accounts that were flagged as suspicious or potentially fraudulent by the site were prevented from messaging paid subscribers but were allowed to continue messaging free users who were tricked into believing that the suspicious accounts were real users encouraging them to subscribe and connect with them. The company denied the allegations. The FTC further alleged that the company offered false promises of guarantees, failed to provide support to customers who unsuccessfully disputed charges, and made it overly difficult for users to cancel their subscriptions, which Match Group disputed as cherry-picked and misrepresenting internal emails. In September 2020, it was reported that the Department of Justice had closed its investigation into the FTC complaint.

Response to 2022 Russian invasion of Ukraine
During the 2022 Russian invasion of Ukraine, Match Group refused to join the international community and withdraw from the Russian market. Research from Yale University updated on April 28, 2022 identifying how companies were reacting to Russia's invasion identified Match Group in the worst category of "Digging In", meaning Defying Demands for Exit: companies defying demands for exit/reduction of activities.

Dating services owned 
As of July, 2020, Match Group owns the following dating services;

References

External links

2015 initial public offerings
IAC (company)
Online dating services of the United States
Companies listed on the Nasdaq
Companies based in Dallas
Online dating services
Dating
Matchmaking